The Honourable Edward Harbottle Grimston (born 2 April 1812 at Mayfair, London; died 4 May 1881 at Pebmarsh, Essex) was an English amateur cricketer and a Conservative Party politician who held a seat in the House of Commons from 1835 to 1841.

Career

Cricket 
Grimston played in 30 first-class cricket matches between 1832 and 1849, mainly for Oxford University and MCC. He was a right-handed batsman and an underarm medium pace bowler.

Politics 
Grimston was elected at the 1835 general election as one of the two Members of Parliament (MPs) for the borough of St Albans in Hertfordshire. He was re-elected in 1837, but resigned his seat in 1841 by the procedural device of appointment as Steward of the Chiltern Hundreds.

Church
After resigning his parliamentary seat, Grimston took holy orders and was rector of Pebmarsh (a parish of which his father was patron) from 1841 until his death in 1881.

Family
Grimston was the second son of James Grimston, 1st Earl of Verulam.  Three of his brothers James, Robert and Francis all played first-class cricket, as did his son Walter and his nephew Lord Hyde.

References

External links
 
 

1812 births
1881 deaths
English cricketers
English cricketers of 1826 to 1863
Alumni of Christ Church, Oxford
Oxford University cricketers
Marylebone Cricket Club cricketers
North v South cricketers
Conservative Party (UK) MPs for English constituencies
UK MPs 1835–1837
UK MPs 1837–1841
Younger sons of earls
Non-international England cricketers
Gentlemen cricketers
Gentlemen of England cricketers
19th-century English Anglican priests
Fast v Slow cricketers